Stars at Noon is a 1959 French mountaineering film directed by Jacques Ertaud and Marcel Ichac. It was entered into the 9th Berlin International Film Festival.

Cast
 Roger Blin
 Pierre Danny
 Pierre Rousseau
 Lionel Terray

References

External links

1959 films
1959 adventure films
French adventure films
1950s French-language films
Mountaineering films
Films directed by Jacques Ertaud
Films directed by Marcel Ichac
Films set in the Alps
1950s French films